Roberto Escalada born Aldo Roberto Leggero (4 July 1914 – 5 December 1986 in Buenos Aires) was an Argentine actor, an icon of the classic era of Argentine cinema.

Roberto Escalada began his career working on the radio, and it was his voice that caught the attention of producers. On meeting him, film producers, pleased by his physical appearance, immediately put him in as a member of different movie casts.

One of his more acclaimed films of the 1940s was Los Pulpos (The Octopuses), a film directed by Carlos Hugo Christensen.

In 1950, Escalada played the central role in Mr Oribe's Crime, based on Bioy Casares' short novel. In 1955 he played a conniving businessman in Ayer fue primavera (Yesterday it was spring), directed by Fernando Ayala.

His life changed at the beginning of the 1960s when he got married and start working on TV. As a heavy smoker, he had some health concerns during the 1960s, and he spent the later years of this life in television taking a number of smaller roles.

He made over 55 film and TV appearances in Argentina between 1939 and 1980.

His health declined in the early 1980s, and he died on 5 December 1986 of a smoking related heart attack at age 72 in Buenos Aires.

Filmography

El diablo metió la pata (1980) dir. Carlos Rinaldi
Hormiga negra (1979) dir. Ricardo Alberto Defilippi
Un idilio de estación (1978) dir. Aníbal Uset
Los irrompibles (1975) dir. Emilio Vieyra
Clínica con música (1974) dir. Francisco Guerrero
El profesor tirabombas (1972) dir. Fernando Ayala
Nino (1972) dir. Federico Curiel
Con alma y vida (1970) dir. David José Kohon
El mundo es de los jóvenes (1970) dir. Julio Porter
Los debutantes en el amor (1969) dir. Leo Fleider
El profesor hippie (1969) dir. Fernando Ayala
Viaje de una noche de verano (1965)
Esta noche mejor no (1965) dir. Julio Saraceni
Dos quijotes sobre ruedas (1964) dir. Emilio Vieyra
La familia Falcón (1963) dir. Román Viñoly Barreto
Culpable (1960) dir. Hugo del Carril
La sombra de Safo (1957) dir. Julio Porter
Pecadora (1956) dir. Enrique Carreras
De noche también se duerme (1956) dir. Enrique Carreras
Ayer fue primavera (1955) dir. Fernando Ayala
Vida nocturna (1955) dir. Leo Fleider
La bestia humana (1954) dir. Daniel Tinayre
Sucedió en Buenos Aires (1954) dir. Enrique Cahen Salaberry
El vampiro negro (1953) dir. Román Viñoly Barreto
 Black Ermine (1953) dir. Carlos Hugo Christensen
 Don't Ever Open That Door (1952) dir. Carlos Hugo Christensen
Sala de guardia (1952) dir. Tulio Demicheli
De turno con la muerte (1951) dir. Julio PorterCartas de amor (1951) dir. Mario C. LugonesUna Viuda casi alegre (1950) dir. Román Viñoly BarretoEl crimen de Oribe (1950) dir. Leopoldo Torres RíosMorir en su ley (1949) dir. Manuel RomeroSe llamaba Carlos Gardel (1949) dir. León Klimovsky¿Por qué mintió la cigüeña? (1949) dir. Carlos Hugo ChristensenLa gran tentación (1948) dir. Ernesto ArancibiaLa muerte camina en la lluvia (1948) Carlos Hugo ChristensenUna atrevida aventurita (1948) dir. Carlos Hugo ChristensenLos pulpos (1948) dir. Carlos Hugo ChristensenEl jugador (1947) dir. León KlimovskyMadame Bovary (1947) dir. Carlos SchlieperTreinta segundos de amor (1947) dir. Luis MotturaUn beso en la nuca (1946) dir. Luis MotturaCinco besos (1945) dir. Luis Saslavsky
 Swan Song (1945) dir. Carlos Hugo ChristensenVeinticuatro horas en la vida de una mujer (1944) dir. Carlos BorcosqueSafo, historia de una pasión (1943) dir. Carlos Hugo ChristensenPájaros sin nido (1940) dir. José A. FerreyraEl matrero (1939) dir. Orestes CavigliaDoce mujeres'' (1939) dir. Luis J. Moglia Barth

External links
 

1914 births
1986 deaths
Male actors from Buenos Aires
Argentine male radio actors
Argentine male film actors
Burials at La Chacarita Cemetery
20th-century Argentine male actors